County Wexford was a constituency represented in the Irish House of Commons until its abolition on 1 January 1801.

Members of Parliament
 1560: William Hore of Harperstown and Richard Synnott of Ballybrennane
 1613–1615: James Furlonge (died and replaced by Walter Synnott) and Thomas Wadding
 1634–1645: William Esmond of Johnstown and Marcus Cheevers
 1639–1649: Sir Arthur Loftus and Nicholas Loftus
 1661–1666: Thomas Scott (expelled and replaced 1665 by Richard Kenney of Edermys) and John Warren

1689–1801

References

External links

Constituencies of the Parliament of Ireland (pre-1801)
Historic constituencies in County Wexford
1800 disestablishments in Ireland
Constituencies disestablished in 1800